Merchants Trust is a large British investment trust dedicated to investments in higher yielding FTSE 100 companies. Established in 1889 by Robin Benson, the company is listed on the London Stock Exchange and is a constituent of the FTSE 250 Index. The chairman is Simon Fraser.

References

External links
  Merchants Trust website

Investment trusts of the United Kingdom